Victor Mugubi Wanyama (born 25 June 1991) is a Kenyan professional footballer who plays as a defensive midfielder for Major League Soccer club CF Montréal and the Kenyan national team.

Wanyama became the first ever Kenyan player to score in the UEFA Champions League when he scored the first goal in Celtic's 2–1 win over Barcelona on 7 November 2012. On 11 July 2013, Wanyama moved to Premier League club Southampton for £12.5 million, making him the most expensive player sold by a Scottish club at the time, surpassing the £9.5 million Russian club Spartak Moscow paid for Aiden McGeady in 2010.

Wanyama has earned over 60 caps for the Kenyan national team since making his international debut in May 2007 at age 15.

Early life 
Wanyama attended Kamukunji High School, which fields a successful football team. Upon leaving High School, he also played with JMJ Academy for three years during which time he also joined Kenyan Premier League clubs Nairobi City Stars and AFC Leopards. In 2007, he joined Allsvenskan club Helsingborg but after the departure of his brother McDonald Mariga to Serie A side Parma in 2008, Wanyama returned to Kenya.

Club career

Beerschot AC 
After a successful trial, Wanyama signed for Beerschot AC on a four-year contract in summer 2008. He made his debut in a League match at the end of the 2008–09 season. In September 2009, he was fined €100 and given a three-match suspension for a violent tackle on Matías Suárez of Anderlecht.

In the summer of 2010 Scottish Premier League club Celtic attempted to sign Wanyama but Beerschot did not allow him to leave. Russian club CSKA Moscow also attempted to sign him, but they failed as well.

Wanyama scored his first goal for Beerschot on 11 December 2010, a 77th-minute equaliser against Westerlo. In April 2011, he received another three match suspension after video evidence showed he had elbowed Brecht Dejaeghere of K.V. Kortrijk.

Celtic 

On 9 July 2011, Wanyama finally completed a £900,000 move to Celtic, after the Scottish club had failed to sign him the previous year. He signed a four-year contract and in doing so became the first ever Kenyan to play in the SPL. Wanyama chose 67 as his squad number to honour the Lisbon Lions, Celtic's 1967 European Cup-winning team.

Wanyama made his Celtic league debut in a 1–0 loss to St Johnstone on 21 August 2011. He played in central defence rather than his favoured central midfield role. He came on as a late substitute in a 4–0 win over Motherwell, and played for the whole second half in a 2–0 League Cup win over Ross County. On 29 September 2011, he started in Celtic's 1–1 draw with Italian team Udinese in the Europa League. This was his first European match for the club. On 10 December 2011, Wanyama scored his first goal for Celtic in a 1–0 win over Hearts at Celtic Park, a tremendous 25-yard strike which hit the top corner. His performances during December earned him the Scottish Premier League young player of the month award. He scored his second Celtic goal on 2 January 2012 in a 3–0 win against Dunfermline at East End Park. Wanyama scored in Celtic's 2–1 win against Dundee United at Celtic Park and in the 4–0 victory against Hearts at Tynecastle.

On 20 October 2012, Wanyama scored twice against St Mirren at St Mirren Park, the second of which was a half volley from 25 yards out. On 25 October, Wanyama's agent released a statement saying that he had turned down an improved contract offer from Celtic, stating that his wage demands could not be met by the club amid speculation of interest from clubs in England. On 7 November, Wanyama opened the scoring with a powerful header as Celtic shocked Barcelona in the Champions League group stage, by beating them 2–1 at Celtic Park.

Wanyama received a nomination for the PFA Scotland Young Player of the Year for 2012–13, but the winner was announced as Leigh Griffiths

Southampton 

After much speculation and a previous breakdown in talks, on 11 July 2013, Wanyama signed for Premier League side Southampton for a fee claimed to be £12.5 million, making him the first Kenyan to ever play in the Premier League.

Wanyama said: 

He made his debut on 17 August 2013, in a 1–0 away win against West Bromwich Albion.  Wanyama made 24 appearances in his first season, but injuries hindered his efforts to make much of an impact in the team.

Under new manager Ronald Koeman, Wanyama came into his own in the 2014–15 season.   He scored his first goal for the club in a 1–0 league victory over Swansea City at the Liberty Stadium on 20 September 2014, after replacing James Ward-Prowse in the 69th minute.  His next goal came in an 8–0 trouncing of Sunderland on 19 October 2014. Wanyama would score his third goal for the Saints in spectacular fashion, a 40-yard shot after Eldin Jakupović's poor clearance fell straight to him, in what proved to be the only goal in a win over Hull City.  His performances saw him awarded the league's African Player of the Month for September, with him stating "It is wonderful being recognised as someone who has done well for his club."

Tottenham Hotspur 

On 23 June 2016, Premier League club Tottenham Hotspur announced that they had reached an agreement with Southampton for the transfer of Wanyama, signing a five-year contract for a fee of £11 million. Wanyama had previously worked with Tottenham manager Mauricio Pochettino who brought him to Southampton in July 2013. Wanyama scored his first goal for the club on his home debut against Crystal Palace, in the 82nd minute of a 1–0 league win for Spurs. The goal made him the 138th different player to score for the club, extending its record for the most variety of goalscorers for a single club in the Premier League.

Early in the 2017–18 season, Wanyama injured his knee in the match against Chelsea and was sidelined for over four months. He returned to training in mid-December.  On 2 January 2018, he made his first appearance after his injury, as a substitute in the away match against Swansea City.  His equalizer in Tottenham's 2–2 draw with Liverpool on 4 February 2018 was voted the Premier League Goal of the Month.

Wanyama picked up a knee injury in a pre-season game of the 2018–19 season against Barcelona. He made his first start of the season two months later in the EFL Cup game against Watford that Spurs won on penalties. At the end of August 2019 Tottenham had agreed to sell Wanyama to Club Brugge for £13 million, however Wanyama had "concerns over the move" and the deal broke down.

CF Montréal 
On 3 March 2020, Tottenham announced that it had agreed to transfer Wanyama to Major League Soccer club Montreal Impact (now CF Montréal), where he would become a Designated Player.

On 11 March 2020, Wanyama made his competitive debut for Montreal at Stade Olympique in the first leg of a quarterfinal in the CONCACAF Champions League, where he was named in manager Thierry Henry's starting side. Wanyama provided an assist to Saphir Taïder – with whom Wanyama was briefly teammates at Southampton in 2014 – a 1–2 defeat by Honduran champions C.D. Olimpia.

On 21 November 2021, the midfielder captained his side to a 1–0 victory over Toronto FC in the 2021 Canadian Championship Final.

In October 2022, Wanyama initially announced that he would not renew his contract with CF Montréal at the end of the season. However, in January 2023, he was officially re-signed by the Canadian club, signing a new two-year contract.

International career 
Wanyama made his debut for the Kenyan senior national team in May 2007, aged just 15, in a friendly against Nigeria. He went on play in all six of Kenya's 2010 FIFA World Cup qualifiers.

Having first become the captain of the Harambee Stars in 2013, he represented Kenya at the 2019 Africa Cup of Nations.

In September 2021, after being repeatedly overlooked for selection during the 2022 FIFA World Cup qualifiers, Wanyama announced his retirement from international football, marking the end of his 14-year duty. However, following the FKF's re-admission in global competitions by FIFA and a personal meeting with Kenya's Sports Minister at the time, Ababu Namwamba, in December 2022 the midfielder officially agreed to restore his eligibility for the senior national team, together with Michael Olunga.

Career statistics

Club

International goals 
As of match played 7 June 2019. Kenya score listed first, score column indicates score after each Wanyama goal.

Honours 
Celtic
Scottish Premier League: 2011–12, 2012–13
Scottish Cup: 2012–13

Tottenham Hotspur
UEFA Champions League runner-up: 2018–19

CF Montréal
Canadian Championship: 2021

Individual
PFA Scotland Team of the Year (SPL): 2012–13
SPL Young Player of the Year: 2012–13
SPL Young Player of the Month: December 2011

Personal life 
Wanyama comes from a sporting family. His brother McDonald Mariga was also a professional footballer, while his other brothers Thomas and Sylvester are also footballers in the Kenyan Premier League. His father, Noah Wanyama, was a footballer for A.F.C. Leopards in the 1980s, and his sister Mercy is a professional basketball player in the USA.

Wanyama is managed by ExtraTime, and has a boot sponsorship deal with Adidas.

In 2015, Wanyama participated in the production of a short film about football in Kenya called Mdudu Boy, written and directed by actress Ella Smith.

See also

Notes

References

External links 

 
 
 Profile on Tottenham Hotspur website
 

1991 births
Living people
Kenyan Luhya people
Footballers from Nairobi
Kenyan footballers
Association football midfielders
Nairobi City Stars players
A.F.C. Leopards players
Helsingborgs IF players
Beerschot A.C. players
Celtic F.C. players
Southampton F.C. players
Tottenham Hotspur F.C. players
CF Montréal players
Scottish Premier League players
Belgian Pro League players
Premier League players

Designated Players (MLS)
Kenya international footballers
2019 Africa Cup of Nations players
Kenyan expatriate footballers
Kenyan expatriate sportspeople in Belgium
Kenyan expatriate sportspeople in Sweden
Kenyan expatriate sportspeople in Scotland
Kenyan expatriate sportspeople in England
Kenyan expatriate sportspeople in Canada
Expatriate footballers in Belgium
Expatriate footballers in Sweden
Expatriate footballers in Scotland
Expatriate footballers in England
Expatriate soccer players in Canada
Major League Soccer players